Daniel Lloyd (born 18 February 1992) is a professional Australian rules footballer playing for the Greater Western Sydney Giants in the Australian Football League (AFL). Lloyd was part of the 2019 Grand Final team

Early life
Lloyd grew up on the Central Coast in New South Wales and played his junior football for the Killarney Vale Bombers. A former scholarship holder with the Western Bulldogs, Lloyd (a Carpenter at the time) was spotted by Assistant Coach Mark McVeigh playing for the Killarney Vale Bombers in the Black Diamond Football League where he kicked nine goals in a semi-final for the Bombers that season and also won Killarney Vale's 2015 Best and Fairest award. He was drafted by Greater Western Sydney with their second selection and twenty-sixth overall in the 2016 rookie draft.

AFL career
He made his debut in the three-point win against  at Spotless Stadium in round eight of the 2017 season.

References

External links

1992 births
Living people
Greater Western Sydney Giants players
Australian rules footballers from New South Wales